Iranotricha is a genus of ground spiders containing the single species, Iranotricha lutensis. It was  first described by Alireza Zamani & Yuri M. Marusik in 2018, and is only found in the Lut Desert, Iran.

References

External links

Gnaphosidae
Monotypic Araneomorphae genera